XHMEC-FM is a radio station in Amecameca on 91.7 FM, owned by the government of the State of Mexico. It is part of the Radio Mexiquense state radio network.

References

Radio stations established in 2002
Radio stations in the State of Mexico
Public radio in Mexico